Swan Valley High School is a public high school located in Thomas Township, Michigan and part of the Swan Valley School District and under the Saginaw ISD.  They are part of the Tri-Valley Central Conference.  Swan Valley has been part of the Mid-Michigan B, TVC East, TVC West, and the TVC Central conferences since its start in 1971. Swan Valley's original mascot was the Panthers which soon changed to the Vikings. When the new high school was built the mascot needed to be changed because there was already a high school in the area that were panthers.  The sports teams of Swan Valley were then divided up between the Vikings and the Valkyries to show individual support for both male and female teams. Later the sports teams were simply called the Vikings and the Lady Vikes.

History 
On June 13, 1966 voters approved the formation of a unified school district. Rumor has it that while the Board was contemplating a name for the new school district, one of the members spotted a Swan on a nearby pond and suggested the Swan Valley School District title. Soon after, voters also approved a $3.9 million bond for the construction of a new elementary (Robert B. Havens which was completed in 1971) and a new high school on 87 acres of land where those buildings sit today.

Ground was broken for Swan Valley High School in July 1971 led by board president Dick Middlebrook and Assistant superintendent Marvin Johnson. The first high school graduation was in 1974 and there have been nearly 7000 alumni since that time.  Swan Valley High School is a highly rated public high school in Thomas Township, MI, on the outskirts of Saginaw, MI. In the 2022-2023 academic year, Swan Valley is listed among the top 10 schools in the Saginaw area. The School district is ranked top three in the Saginaw area.

Demographics
The demographic breakdown of the 573 students enrolled in 2021-22 was:

 Male - 58.2%
 Female - 41.7%
 American Indian/Alaska Native - 1%
 Asian- 0%
 Black - 2.2%
 Hispanic - 12.9%
 Native Hawaiian/Pacific Islander - 0%
 White - 80.6%
 Multiracial - 3.6%

30.5% of the students were eligible for free or reduced-cost lunch.

Academics 
Swan Valley offers some advancement placement (AP) courses that can be taken for college credit that include: World History, Calculus AB, Computer Science, Literature & Composition. For those students who qualify through the IEPC process, the high school offers special education programming. Each student is assigned a case load teacher who monitors his or her progress through graduation. The average ACT score for the school is 25  has an average SAT score of 1160. Swan Valley purchased iPads for every student shortly after the 2014-2015 school year began. The iPads are combined with an education concept known as one-to-one learning, a program fairly new to the state of Michigan as a whole. The school is set up on trimesters.

Athletics
The Swan Valley Vikings are currently part of the Tri-Valley Conference Central Division. Its currently a Class-B school. Swan Valley High School offers several varsity sports, including:

 Football 
Class B State Champ Runner ups 2017
 Basketball (boys and girls)
 Competitive Cheer (girls)
 Pom Pon - Class B State Champs 2012 (not MHSAA sanctioned)
 Cross Country (boys and girls)
 Soccer (boys and girls)
 Bowling (boys and girls)
 Boys State Champs 2016
 Girls state champs 2008
 Golf (boys)
 Track & Field (boys and girls)
 Volleyball 
 Wrestling 
 Ice Hockey (boys)
 Baseball 
 State champs 2001
 Softball (girls)
 State champs 1986
   State Runner ups- 1994, 2002, 2012, 2013

Notable alumni 

Daryl Szarenski (1986) - Three time Olympic qualifier - Pistol

Distinguished Alumni Award winners 
Dr. Donald R. Gilbert 1998

Jeffrey A. Castillo 1999

Edwin C. Flattery 2000

Susan Whaley-Brady 2001

John Owen Hamilton 2002

Sharyl Ann Majorski-Briggs 2003

Luann Freier Marx 2004

Dr. Tari Lynch-Caris 2005

Margo Houston-Barocko 2006

Colonel Merrily D. Madero 2007

Stephen Sowuleski 2008

Heidi Erlenbeck 2009

Lieutenant Colonel Michael Weiss 2010

Tracy A. Weber, PhD. 2011

J. Coffey 2012

Keith Martin 2013

Honorable Laura Frawley 2014

Mike Cousins 2015

Lieutenant Erica Ziel 2016

Jay Fosgitt 2017

Tom Kluck 2018

Theo Keith 2019 - Two time Grammy winning political reporter

Lynda Thayer 2020

Mark Garabelli 2021

Bethany Campbell Charlton 2022

See also
 List of schools in Saginaw, Michigan

References

External links
 School website
 Swan Valley School District

Public high schools in Michigan
Educational institutions established in 1971
Schools in Saginaw County, Michigan
1971 establishments in Michigan
Saginaw Intermediate School District